This list contains all cultural property of national significance (class A) in the canton of Neuchâtel from the 2009 Swiss Inventory of Cultural Property of National and Regional Significance. It is sorted by municipality and contains 90 individual buildings, 17 collections and 23 archaeological finds.

The geographic coordinates provided are in the Swiss coordinate system as given in the Inventory.

Bevaix

Boudry

Cornaux

Cortaillod

Cressier

Gorgier

Hauterive

La Brévine

La Chaux-de-Fonds

La Chaux-du-Milieu

La Sagne

La Tène

Le Landeron

Le Locle

Les Verrières

Milvignes

Neuchâtel

Rochefort

Saint-Aubin-Sauges

Saint-Blaise

Val-de-Ruz

Val-de-Travers

Vaumarcus

References
 All entries, addresses and coordinates are from:

External links
 Swiss Inventory of Cultural Property of National and Regional Significance, 2009 edition:

PDF documents: Class B objects
Geographic information system